Ocean Terminal is a shopping centre in the Leith area of Edinburgh, Scotland, designed by Sir Terence Conran.

History

It is built on former industrial docklands on the north side of the city, at the edge of the boundary between formerly separate ports of Newhaven and Leith.  The land was formerly occupied by the Henry Robb shipyard, which closed in 1983. Since then, the area has undergone urban renewal and regeneration, much led by and on the lands in the ownership of Forth Ports.

These and other developments have played key parts in the regeneration of Leith. The now-decommissioned Royal Yacht Britannia, which is accessed via the Britannia Visitor Centre within Ocean Terminal, is permanently berthed next to the building and can be viewed from the centre. Although originally planned to also function as a working passenger terminal, the permanent berthing of the Britannia has meant that the building has never been used for this function, despite its name.

The berth occupied by Britannia was originally planned to handle cruise liners. As Britannia is now permanently moored alongside the Ocean Terminal, Forth Ports plan to build another terminal for cruise liners.

There is an Antony Gormley sculpture located on an abandoned pier behind the building.

Current stores
PureGym, H&M and HMV are the Terminal's main shops; in total there are some 85 shops, 6 restaurants, 3 coffee shops, a variety of bars and cafés, as well as a cinema Vue, an indoor children's play area, a roller skating rink and a day spa. British Home Stores was an anchor tenant until 2016, and Debenhams until 2021.

Transport
The centre has car parking facilities and Lothian Buses services 11, 34, 35, 36 & Skylink 200 terminate and begin there. The shopping centre is planned to be a stop on the Edinburgh Trams Newhaven route, which is currently under construction and due to be opened in early 2023.

Redevelopment
In late-2018, the owners of the centre announced plans to refurbish and rebrand the centre as Porta, with a focus being placed on outlets and factory stores. In June 2020, these plans were dropped by new joint venture owners, ICG Real Estate and Ambassador Group and instead invest £10 million in the centre.

References

External links

Ocean Terminal Shopping Centre website

Buildings and structures in Leith
Shopping centres in Edinburgh
Buildings and structures completed in 2001
2001 establishments in Scotland